Heart is the fifth album by L'Arc-en-Ciel, released on February 25, 1998. It is the band's first album with yukihiro on drums, and marked the band's return to mainstream attention following the arrest of the former drummer sakura. It reached number one on the Oricon chart and sold over a million copies, being certified by the RIAJ.

The first single to be released from this album was "Niji".

Track listing

Personnel
 hyde – vocals, alto sax on track 1, "master devil" on track 7
 ken – guitar, autoharp on track 1, tambourine on tracks 5 and 10
 tetsu – bass guitar
 yukihiro – drums, industrial noise on track 1, metal percussion on tracks 4 and 7
 Hajime Okano - keyboards on tracks 1, 6 and 7, ARP 2600 on track 8
 Hitoshi Saitou - keyboards on track 1
 Shinri Sasaki piano on track 2
 Chieko Kanehara - strings on tracks 2 and 10
 Shirou Sasaki - horns on track 2
 Chinpaul Gorichie - female chorus on track 2
 Hal-Oh Togashi - keyboards on track 3
 Kyoya Kimura - "devil's voice" on track 7
 Chinpaul Gilbert - "grand master devil" on track 7, 12-string guitar on track 9

References

1998 albums
L'Arc-en-Ciel albums